Dyagilevo is a rural locality (a village) in Slobodskoye Rural Settlement, Kharovsky District, Vologda Oblast, Russia. The population was 14 as of 2002.

Geography 
Dyagilevo is located 53 km northeast of Kharovsk (the district's administrative centre) by road. Strelitsa is the nearest rural locality.

References 

Rural localities in Kharovsky District